David Weir (born 1947) is an American scholar who has written widely on the Decadent movement in literature and its impact in America. Weir is Associate Professor on the Faculty of Humanities and Social Sciences at The Cooper Union for the Advancement of Science and Art.

Bibliography 
 Decadence and the Making of Modernism (1995) 
 James Joyce and the Art of Mediation (1996) 
 Anarchy and Culture (Critical Perspectives on Modern Culture) (1997) 
 Brahma in the West: William Blake and the Oriental Renaissance (2003) 
 Decadent Culture in the United States: Art and Literature Against the American Grain, 1890-1926 (2009) 
 American Orient: Imagining the East from the Colonial Era Through the Twentieth Century (2011)

References 

Decadent literature
Cooper Union faculty
1947 births
Living people